Hibernus Mortis is a band started in December, 1995 by Cesar Placeres and Ralf Varela. The band took its name from the ancient Latin translation for "Dead Winter" (mortuus hiemis). Starting out, the South Florida band's primary goal was to create some of the most crushing and extreme music ever recorded. Taking influence from a variety of sources, the band took musical inspiration from old-school death metal bands like Incantation, Autopsy, Morbid Angel, Death, Dismember, Immolation, Entombed, Obituary, Vader and Suffocation just to name a few.

The band's sound is mainly categorized as death metal, with definite black metal and doom metal influence. Hibernus Mortis has been a staple of the legendary Florida death metal scene for over a decade and has a global fanbase as well.  Fans all around the world from as far away as Germany, Norway and Iceland, Cuba, to South Africa, Singapore, and Australia all enjoy music from Hibernus Mortis.  The band has always retained an underground low-key status, but definitely sports a modest cult following. The band is currently based out of Hialeah, Florida.

Members 

Over the years the band has gone through several line-up changes, with the only core member being Cesar Placeres.

(2005 - )
Alex Campbell - Vocals and Guitar
David Miller - Guitar and Vocals
Adrian Esquivel - Bass
Cesar Placeres - Drums

(2004–2005)
Ralf Varela - Vocals and Guitar
Alex Campbell - Guitar
David Miller - Bass and Vocals
Cesar Placeres - Drums

(2000–2003)
Ralf Varela - Vocals and Guitar
Doug Humlack - Guitar
David Miller - Bass and Vocals
Cesar Placeres - Drums

(1999–2000)
Ralf Varela - Vocals and Guitar
Doug Humlack - Guitar
Cesar Placeres - Drums

(1998–1999)
Ralf Varela - Vocals and Guitar
Doug Humlack - Guitar
Yasser Morales - Bass
Cesar Placeres - Drums

(1996–1998)
Adam Fleury - Vocals
Ralf Varela - Guitar
Doug Humlack - Guitar
Yasser Morales - Bass
Cesar Placeres - Drums

Subject matter 

The band's lyrics as well as overall presentation and imagery have always been set in a bleak and morose atmosphere. The band's songs deal with  a wide variety of topics including the apocalypse, death, suffering, revenge, solitude, and hatred.

On rare occasion the band has been known to get lyrical inspiration from movies.  Two movies in particular have inspired songs: The Prophecy and Urotsukidoji: Legend of the Overfiend.

Guitar sound 
Since the beginning, one of the band's most distinguishing qualities was their ridiculously de-tuned and ferocious guitar sound. Hibernus Mortis was one of the pioneers of the still-rare practice of tuning to "G". Aside from the ultra low tuning, the band achieves their trademark guitar sound through the use of thick strings and unconventional equipment.

Discography 
Studio albums
 The Existing Realms of Perpetual Sorrow (2002)
 The Monoliths of Cursed Slumber (2022)

Live albums
 Live Manslaughter (2000)

Demos
 Into the Thresholds of Dead Winter (1998)

Concert history 
Even though the band rarely performs, Hibernus Mortis has shared the stage with some of the biggest names in the genre.

Related bands 
The members of Hibernus Mortis have played in several previous bands, as well as current side projects. Here is a list of some of the bands Hibernus Mortis members have been linked to.

 Los Bastardos Magnificos
 Thrash or Die
 Mehkago N.T.
 Consular
 Enemy Against Enemy
 The Sonny Chiba Death Cult
 Acrimonium
 Devastator
 Capra Hircus
 Tyranny Of Shaw
 Tomb
 Black Spit Prophecy
 Jinchu
 Goat Resurrection
 Graud y Los Marcianos

References

External links
 The Official Hibernus Mortis Website
 The Official Hibernus Mortis MySpace page

Death metal musical groups from Florida
Musical groups from Miami
Musical groups established in 1995